Salomon may refer to:

People
 Salomon (given name)
 Salomon (surname)

Companies
 Salomon Brothers, a former investment bank, now a part of Citigroup
 Salomon Group, a company manufacturing sporting equipment (which was a part of Adidas-Salomon AG)

Other uses
 Salomon Islands, an atoll of the British Indian Ocean Territory

See also
 Haym Salomon Nursing Home, named in honor of Haym Salomon, located in Brooklyn, NY
 Salomo (disambiguation)
 Soloman (disambiguation)
 Solomon (disambiguation)
 Solomon (name)